Sean Armstrong (born 11 May 1973) is a Barbadian cricketer. He played in fourteen first-class matches for the Barbados cricket team from 1995 to 2002.

See also
 List of Barbadian representative cricketers

References

External links
 

1973 births
Living people
Barbadian cricketers
Barbados cricketers
People from Saint Philip, Barbados